Rapana bulbosa is a species of sea snail, a marine gastropod mollusk in the family Muricidae, the murex snails or rock snails.

Description

The Rapana Bulbosa seashell is hard and heavy. It is also called the Turnip shell because of its shape. Its wide opening makes a favorite for listening to resonant ocean sounds. These seashells range between 1-3/4" to 2-1/4" long.

Distribution
The Rapana bulbosa is found on the ocean floor in the Indian and western Pacific Oceans, across the waters of Micronesia and Polynesia, the Coral Sea and around the Philippines. Along the Australian Coast it is found from Northern New South Wales to northern Western Australia, and along the east coast of Africa including Madagascar. Found between depths of 10 and 40 metres (35–130 ft), it is often associated with live coral colonies, such as the table-forming Acropora, either found on the reefs themselves or the sandy sea bottom nearby. Once common, it is now much less abundant due to shell collecting and the destruction of its habitat by such processes as dynamite fishing, especially in shallower areas. Carnivorous, the adult Rapana bulbosa eats coral and various invertebrates, while juveniles eat algae.

References

Rapana
Gastropods described in 1817